Woodridge College is a  private, co-educational school in the Eastern Cape, South Africa.

Woodridge is situated near the small town of Thornhill, Kouga, halfway between Jeffrey's Bay and Port Elizabeth. The school is attended by both boarders and day-scholars.

Motto 
The motto of the school is Fideliter, as can be seen on the school emblem, meaning "Faithfully".

Location 
It is situated on the edge of the gorge that has been created by Van Stadens River, next to the Van Stadens Bridge.

History 
The school was started by the Carter family in 1936, all of whose descendants have attended the school. Originally the school was only a preparatory school, and the college was started during the 1960s.
On June 10, 2017, Woodridge experienced a fire that engulfed at least half of the campus.

Curriculum 
The school offers the standard schooling under the guidelines of the Independent Schools Association of Southern Africa, and pupils taking their National Senior Certificate write the IEB examinations. Woodridge is also strongly supporting outdoor education, meaning that the students frequently take outdoor excursions and learn outdoors or about the outdoors.

Sport 
Woodridge is involved in the sports of rugby, cricket, hockey, star gazing, netball, squash, tennis, bird watching, athletics and water polo. Surf lifesaving is also offered.

Other sports offered are rock climbing, canoeing, and hiking. Outdoor education is offered, which is similar to Outward Bound,  although it got its roots more from the Veld en Vlei society in nearby Sedgefield which many Old Woodridgeans used to attend, which was later bought out by the Outward Bound association. The Outward Bound was modelled on the Scottish school Gordonstoun, as was the rating system.

Inter house competitions are held for all sports offered by the school. The Outdoor Education house trophy is considered the most revered of house trophies.

Notable alumni
Colin Ingram - cricketer
James Kamte, - golfer
Jade de Klerk - cricketer
Mark Rushmere - cricketer
Riki Wessels - cricketer
Edith Molikoe - Hockey

Headmasters 
The Headmaster of the school is Derek Bradley.

Previous headmasters include:
 2017–present: Derek Bradley
 2014-2017: Simon Crane
 2005-2014: Craig Neave
 2002-2004: Ken Ball
 1997-2001: Guy Norman Pearson
 1967-1992: Keith Starck

Simon Crane joined as deputy headmaster in 2013. He is British born, an ex Bishops pupil and has served roles both in the UK (Milton Abbey School) and KwaZulu Natal (Carter High School (South Africa)) and Michaelhouse).

Religious teachings 
Woodridge is considered a Christian school, and is a parish of the Anglican church.

References

External links 
 

Boarding schools in South Africa
Private schools in the Eastern Cape
1936 establishments in South Africa
Kouga Local Municipality